Julian Phillips may refer to:
 Julian Phillips (TV presenter)
 Julian Phillips (basketball)

See also
 Julian Philips, British composer